The Moxy Show is an American animated anthology television series produced by Hanna-Barbera, Colossal Pictures and Turner Broadcasting System for Cartoon Network. The show consisted of classic cartoons divided by 3-D animated interstitials featuring Moxy and Flea, respectively a dog and a flea. The Moxy Show ran on Cartoon Network from December 5, 1993, originally as The Moxy Pirate Show, to December 25, 1995; its finale was the sole episode for The Moxy & Flea Show. Reruns lasted until May 25, 1996. It's not considered the first original series on Cartoon Network, but the title character was Cartoon Network's first original character. Space Ghost Coast to Coast on the other hand, is considered Cartoon Network's first fully produced series.

Production
The series was first known as The Moxy Pirate Show, which featured Moxy. In 1994, the series was retooled as The Moxy Show. The series was shortened to a half-hour show and Moxy's sidekick Flea was introduced. In 1995, it was renamed again to The Moxy & Flea Show, with major changes for a single episode:
 Moxy's design changed to a large degree. As opposed to wearing his usual yellow shirt with red/black checkerboard pants, and palette-swapped black and white sneakers; both of which resemble the likeness of Cartoon Network's traditional checkerboard logo, he is seen wearing a longer sleeved, green/black striped shirt and black jeans, complete with non palette-swapped sneakers, which seem to resemble those of Converse All-Stars. In addition, his eyes have become much smaller, with heterochromic green (left) and light blue (right) eyes complete with pupils, whereas they were previously red (left) and dark blue (right), sans pupils. His yellow whiskers and freckles have disappeared in his new design, his nose changed from the color purple to black, and his fur was changed to a darker shade of orange. He kept the white gloves.
 Flea's design was slightly changed. Flea wore a blue fez instead of a propeller beanie, his height was increased, making him half as tall as Moxy. His eye color changed from blue and yellow to just yellow eyes with red pupils. Comedian Chris Rock replaced illusionist Penn Jillette as the voice of the character.
 A new opening sequence was used, featuring a new theme song composed by Ben Friedman. Moxy and Flea dance new moves and have almost no speaking parts (in one part, Moxy says "Come on!").

The pilot did not test well enough to allow more episodes to be produced, as revealed by Frank Gresham who worked on The Moxy & Flea Show. Reruns were removed completely after May 25, 1996.

The CGI Moxy is considered the first real-time (sometimes called a "live") cartoon, though only broadcast live through the "Great International Toon-In". A puppeteer wearing a motion capture apparatus would act out Moxy's motions, while Goldthwait provided the voice, and a technician would control facial expressions.

The series is considered lost media due to the fact that it never aired on reruns, was never released on home media, or having any full episodes existing on the internet. However, short clips and bumpers were recorded by fans and uploaded to YouTube.

Characters

Moxy
Moxy (voiced by Bobcat Goldthwait impersonating Cheech Marin) is a 3-D animated dog who liked to spend time goofing off and having fun with his sidekick, Flea, and also has a crush on Melody from Josie and the Pussycats. Although he never made it big in the cartoon industry, and usually auditioned for a number of roles on the network without making a call back, he was given the opportunity to work as the janitor at Cartoon Network, and usually 'jammed the signal' once a week during the days when he flew solo before Flea was introduced.

His first appearance on television were during the live commercial segments that aired simultaneously during the November 26, 1993 "Great International Toon-In" marathon on three of the main Turner-owned networks at the time; TNT, TBS, and Cartoon Network. His catchphrase is a lip-flapping sound, barking and a fart sound, stating that he just made it up.

Flea
Flea (voiced by Penn Jillette in The Moxy Show and Chris Rock in The Moxy & Flea Show) is Moxy's sidekick, and usually the straight man of the duo, who enjoyed spending time and watching television with Moxy. He helps a monkey king get a new set of hair to hide his bald skin causing him to rise through fame. In "Abducted", it has been revealed that he has a card, and his name was "Flealonius A. Flea".

Episodes

The Moxy Show era

The Moxy & Flea Show era

Notes

References

External links
 

1990s American animated television series
1990s American anthology television series
1993 American television series debuts
1995 American television series endings
American children's animated anthology television series
American computer-animated television series
Animated television series about dogs
Cartoon Network original programming
English-language television shows
Television series by Hanna-Barbera